Downstairs is an independently-released EP by 311, which was recorded in Nick Hexum's basement. The exact date of recording and release for this EP is unknown, with many sources indicating it was recorded and released in 1989, while its Discogs page claims it was recorded around 1992. It was released without a cover art.

EP information
Almost nothing is known about the Downstairs EP, and an original version of it is almost impossible to find. However, a copy of the EP can easily be found circulating in bootleg circles and tape trading communities. The Downstairs EP suffers from guitar so scratchy that the instrument produced an unintended grinding "ringing" sound so high-pitched that it distorted the sound of the tape upon recording. On this EP, "Right Now" is one of the songs most afflicted with the grinding, ringing guitar noise. Owners of original copies of the EP (not the bootleg version) report that the grinding, ringing guitar noise is in fact present on the original source material. This cassette is no longer sold anywhere.

Track listing
 "Feels So Good" 3:10
 "Right Now" 4:15
 "Fat Chance" 2:55
 "Unity" 3:02
 "Today My Love" 4:27
 "C.U.T.M." 3:52

References

External links
MusicMoz website for Downstairs EP.

311 (band) albums
1989 debut EPs